Withern is a village in the civil parish of Withern with Stain, in the East Lindsey district of Lincolnshire, England. Stain was once an independent parish but was combined with Withern when the old church of St John the Baptist was destroyed some centuries ago.

According to A Dictionary of British Place Names, the Withern name is derived from the Old English Widu or wudu, with oern, meaning "house in the Wood". Another source gives the name as deriving from Old Norse  "wood" + OE  "house", meaning "the house in the wood", giving 'Witheren' in the 14th century. In the 1086 Domesday Book, the village name is given as Widerne.

The parish was in the ancient Calceworth Wapentake in the East Lindsey district in the parts of Lindsey. After the Poor Law Amendment Act reforms of 1834, the parish became part of the Louth Poor Law Union.

The now redundant church of St Margaret's is the burial place of Auguste Pahud and Annie Pahud, whose love story is the raison d'être for the local Hubbard's Hills park. St Margaret's was rebuilt in 1812.

A Wesleyan Methodist chapel was built in 1875, though the congregation dates from about 1811.

A Public Elementary School was built in the hamlet of Stain in 1850 and enlarged in 1858 to hold 100 children. The Wesleyans built a school in 1875.

The manor house was the seat of the Fitzwilliam family. It was occupied as a farmhouse in 1900, but the moat still exists. The Grant family lived in the house at one time, their daughter being Annie Pahud.

Population

Governance
An electoral ward in the name of the Civil Parish exists. This ward stretches south east to Saleby with a total population taken at the Census of 2011 of 1,826.

References

Further reading
Platt, John (2005); Withern: The Story of a Lincolnshire Parish, Louth Naturalists', Antiquarian & Literary Society.

External links

Villages in Lincolnshire
Civil parishes in Lincolnshire
East Lindsey District